Marie Octavie Coudreau (née Renard;  1867–1938) was a French explorer from Anais, Charente, and author of several books on French Guiana and northern Brazil. In 1899, the Brazilian states of Pará and Amazonas hired Coudreau to explore and chart the Amazon region. Her husband was the French explorer and geographer Henri Coudreau.

Exploration of the Amazon
At the time of the contesté franco-brésilien boundary dispute between  colonial France and Brazil, Coudreau's husband Henri  worked in the service of governors of the states of Brazil, mapping the Amazon's tributaries and identifying possible resources for farmers and foresters. On behalf of the State of Pará, Henri Coudreau was charged with exploring the Trombetas River, shortly after Octavie married him.

Their first expedition in 1899 ended tragically, as detailed in the book Voyage au Trombetas begun by Henri Coudreau.  It describes their voyage up the Trombetas tributary of the north bank of the Amazon. He was already sick and exhausted by the years spent in what he called the "green hell". Suffering from malarial fever, he died in her arms on 10 November 1899. Aided by his traveling companions, she made a coffin from the planks of the boat and prepared a burial on a promontory overlooking Lake Tapagem.

After Henri Coudreau's death, she continued the exploration work begun by her husband for seven years.  She later wrote the final chapters of the book, following the repatriation of his remains to Angoulême in France.

From 1899 to 1906, she worked as an official explorer for the French government, a role not normally open to women at the time. Enduring the same levels of hardship that had eventually killed her husband, she made pioneering contributions to the knowledge of the Amazon tropical area.

She died in Sonnac.

Published works
Voyage Au Trombetas: 7 Août 1899-25 Novembre 1899, 
Voyage Au Cuminá: 20 Avril 1900-7 Septembre 1900
Voyage Au Maycur, 5 Juin 1902-12 Janvier, 1903
Voyage Au Rio Curua (1903)

References

External links
 HenriCoudreau.fr

French explorers
French geographers
Date of birth missing
1867 births
1938 deaths
Female explorers
Explorers of Amazonia